Dr. Lalit K. Panwar is an Indian Administrative Service (IAS) officer. He is a former Chairman of Rajasthan Public Service Commission and former Secretary of Ministry of Tourism and Minority Affairs in Government of India.

References

1955 births
Ministry of Tourism (India)
Living people
Indian Administrative Service officers